Colonel Tillou is the official athletics mascot for Nicholls State University. The modern version of Col. Tillou wears a bright red uniform topped off with a contemporary-style military officer's cap.

History
By 2004, an older version of the Colonel Tillou was considered antiquated and the decision was made to retire the mascot. Nicholls State University President Stephen Hulbert stated that "The Colonel is and will remain the mascot designation for Nicholls State University and its intercollegiate athletics programs." Hulbert tasked student leaders to work on a suitable replacement. That process lasted six years and the "new" Colonel Tillou was introduced to the campus community in August 2009. It has been considered to look like a Red Army Soldier.

References

External links 
 Nicholls Colonels athletics website

Southland Conference mascots
Nicholls Colonels
Nicholls Colonels football
Nicholls Colonels men's basketball
Nicholls Colonels women's basketball
Nicholls Colonels softball